Magnus Böcker (31 August 1961 – 26 July 2017) was a Swedish businessman and the Executive Chairman of Blibros Capital Partners, an investment company based in Singapore and Stockholm. He was also chairman and co-founder of Tryb.

Professional career

SGX and OMX 
Böcker was the CEO of the Singapore Exchange (SGX) from 1 December 2009 to 30 June 2015, and previously the President of NASDAQ. Prior to that, he played a large role in the creation of OMX, the Nordic exchange and technology group, and the eventual merger of OMX and Nasdaq in 2008. He served in various capacities, including CFO, COO and president of the OMX Technology division before he became CEO of OMX in 2003.

Leadership roles 
Böcker held many past appointments, including Chairman of the Board at Orc Group AB, Chairman of Dustin AB, Chairman of the Diversity Action Committee Singapore, and Board Member of the World Federation of Exchanges, the Mount Sinai Surgery Advisory Board in New York, and Council Member of the Institute of Banking and Finance in Singapore.

Advisory roles 
Böcker was a Member of the CSM Sport and Entertainment Global Advisory Board, the Shanghai International Financial Advisory Council, the Sim Kee Boon Institute for Financial Economics at Singapore Management University, and the Bandra Kurla Complex International Financial Services Centre in Mumbai.

Böcker also held several advisory roles in the financial market – he was Senior Advisor to Bain Inc. in relation to Financial Services (including Financial Markets, Exchanges and Fintec), and Advisor to Permira in Asia.

References

External links 
 
 Magnus Böcker collected news and commentary at Bloomberg
 Magnus Böcker collected news and commentary at The Wall Street Journal

1961 births
2017 deaths
Singapore Exchange
Stockholm University alumni
Deaths from cancer in Singapore
People from Hallsberg Municipality